Khondkar Misbah-ul-Azim NPP, ndu, afwc, psc is a two star Admiral of Bangladesh Navy and the incumbent Commander of Dhaka Naval Area (COMDHAKA). Prior to joining the navy, he served as the Commander Submarine (COMSUB). In addition, he served as the Director of Directorate of Naval Operations, Naval Headquarters, Dhaka.

Early life and education 
Azim joined Bangladesh Navy on 1 January 1987 and received his commission with distinction in the Executive Branch. He underwent basic naval officer's training in Royal Malaysian Navy.

Career 
Azim, in his naval career, commanded BNS SHAH AMANAT, BNS SAIKAT, BNS NIRBHOY, BNS S R AMIN, and BN Frigate BNS UMAR FAROOQ (F-16). He served as Director at Directorate of Naval Operations, NHQ Dhaka in 2014-15. He received National Integrity Award 2020-2021 from Bangladesh Navy.

Family 
Rear Admiral Khondkar Misbah-ul-Azim is married to Nurtaz Azim and was blessed with two daughters Nuzabah and Mehtaz.

References 

Bangladeshi Navy admirals
Bangladesh Navy personnel
Year of birth missing (living people)
Living people